MITRA can refer to:

 MITRA Youth Buddhist Network, a network of Buddhist youth organisations in Australia
 Movement against Intimidation, Threat and Revenge against Activists (MITRA), a network of NGOs and activists based in Mumbai

See also
 Mitra (disambiguation)